Weisenstein is a surname. Notable people with the surname include:

Greg Weisenstein (born  1947), former President of West Chester University of Pennsylvania 
Yehuda Weisenstein (born 1955), Israeli fencer